The 1999–2000 network television schedule for the six major English language commercial broadcast networks in the United States. The schedule covers primetime hours from September 1999 through August 2000. The schedule is followed by a list per network of returning series, new series, and series cancelled after the 1998–99 season.

PBS is not included; member stations have local flexibility over most of their schedules and broadcast times for network shows may vary.

New series highlighted in bold.

All times are U.S. Eastern and Pacific Time (except for some live sports or events). Subtract for one hour for Central, Mountain, Alaska and Hawaii-Aleutian times.

Each of the 30 highest-rated shows is listed with its rank and rating as determined by Nielsen Media Research.

Legend

Sunday

Monday

Tuesday

Note: On Fox, Ally aired as re-edited half-hour repeats of the original hour-long Ally McBeal series. On CBS, Falcone premieres at 9:00 p.m. on April 4, 2000. On UPN, Secret Agent Man was supposed to premiere at 9:00pm, but however due to the show not getting the "buzz" before the fall premiere, The Strip was premiered instead, and the show aired later on in a different night.

Wednesday

Note: On ABC, Clerks premiered at 9:30 p.m. on May 31, 2000.

Thursday

Note: On NBC, the sitcom Daddio premiered on March 23, 2000, at 8:30. On Fox, Family Guy only had two airings and one special Sunday airing, and then on March 7, 2000, the show was moved to Tuesdays. On The WB, Popular premiered Wednesday, September 29, 1999, at 9:00 pm. On Fox, Manchester Prep was supposed to air at 8–9, but it was cancelled at the last minute. On ABC, Then Came You was scheduled to air at 8:30 PM EST, but due to the show not getting the "buzz" before the fall premiere, Whose Line Is It Anyway? was aired at the last minute, and the show aired later on in a different night.

Friday

Saturday

By network

ABC

Returning series
20/20
America's Funniest Home Videos
Boy Meets World
Dharma & Greg
The Drew Carey Show
The Hughleys
It's Like, You Know...
Monday Night Football
Norm (formerly known as The Norm Show)
NYPD Blue
The Practice
Sabrina the Teenage Witch
Spin City
Sports Night
Two Guys and a Girl (formerly known as Two Guys, a Girl and a Pizza Place)
Whose Line Is It Anyway?
The Wonderful World of Disney

New series
Clerks: The Animated Series *
Making the Band *
Odd Man Out
Oh, Grow Up
Once and Again
Snoops
Talk to Me *
Then Came You *
Wasteland
Who Wants to Be a Millionaire
Wonderland *

Not returning from 1998–99:
The Big Moment
Brother's Keeper
Cupid
Fantasy Island
Home Improvement
The Secret Lives of Men
Strange World
Two of a Kind
Vengeance Unlimited

CBS

Returning series
48 Hours
60 Minutes
60 Minutes II
Becker
Candid Camera
CBS Sunday Movie
Chicago Hope
Cosby
Diagnosis: Murder
Early Edition
Everybody Loves Raymond
JAG
Kids Say the Darndest Things
The King of Queens
Martial Law
Nash Bridges
Touched by an Angel
Walker, Texas Ranger

New series
Big Brother
City of Angels *
Falcone *
Family Law
Grapevine *
Judging Amy
Ladies Man
Love & Money
Now and Again
Survivor
Winning Lines *
Work with Me

Not returning from 1998–99:
The Brian Benben Show
Buddy Faro
L.A. Doctors
Maggie Winters
The Magnificent Seven
The Nanny
Payne
Promised Land
Sons of Thunder
To Have & to Hold
Turks
Unsolved Mysteries

Fox

Returning series
Ally McBeal
America's Most Wanted
Beverly Hills, 90210
Beyond Belief: Fact or Fiction
COPS
Family Guy
FOX Night at the Movies
Futurama
Guinness World Records Primetime
King of the Hill
Party of Five
The PJs
That '70s Show
The Simpsons
The World's Funniest!
World's Wildest Police Videos
The X-Files

New series
Action
Ally
American High *
Get Real
Greed *
Harsh Realm
Malcolm in the Middle *
Opposite Sex *
Ryan Caulfield: Year One
Time of Your Life
Titus *

Not returning from 1998–99:
Brimstone
Costello
Fox Files
Getting Personal
Holding the Baby
Living in Captivity
Melrose Place
Millennium

NBC

Returning series
3rd Rock from the Sun
Dateline NBC
ER
Frasier
Friends
Jesse
Just Shoot Me!
Law & Order
NBC Sunday Night Movie
The Pretender
Profiler
Providence
Suddenly Susan
Veronica's Closet
Will & Grace
World's Most Amazing Videos

New series
Battery Park *
Cold Feet
Daddio *
Freaks and Geeks
God, the Devil and Bob *
Law & Order: Special Victims Unit
M.Y.O.B. *
The Mike O'Malley Show
Mysterious Ways *
The Others *
Sammy *
Stark Raving Mad
Third Watch
Twenty-One *
The West Wing

Not returning from 1998–99:
Caroline in the City
Conrad Bloom
Encore! Encore!
Everything's Relative
Homicide: Life on the Street
LateLine
Mad About You
Michelle (moves to The WB)
NewsRadio
Trinity
Wind on Water
Working

UPN

Returning series
Dilbert
Malcolm & Eddie
Moesha
Seven Days
Star Trek: Voyager
UPN's Night at the Movies

New series
The Beat *
Grown Ups
I Dare You: The Ultimate Challenge *
The Parkers
Secret Agent Man *
Shasta McNasty
The Strip
Blockbuster Video Shockwave Cinema
WWF SmackDown

Not returning from 1998–99:
America's Greatest Pets
Between Brothers
Clueless
DiResta
Family Rules
Guys Like Us
Home Movies
Legacy
Love Boat: The Next Wave
Mercy Point
Power Play
Redhanded
Reunited
The Secret Diary of Desmond Pfeiffer

The WB

Returning series
7th Heaven
Buffy the Vampire Slayer
Charmed
Dawson's Creek
Felicity
For Your Love
The Jamie Foxx Show
Michelle (moved from NBC)
Movie Stars
The Steve Harvey Show
Zoe (formerly known as Zoe, Duncan, Jack and Jane)

New series
Angel
Baby Blues *
Brutally Normal *
D.C. *
Jack & Jill
Mission Hill
Popular
Roswell
Safe Harbor
Young Americans *

Not returning from 1998–99:
The Army Show
Hyperion Bay
Katie Joplin
The Parent 'Hood
Rescue 77
Sister, Sister
Smart Guy
Unhappily Ever After
The Wayans Bros.

Note: The * indicates that the program was introduced in midseason.

References

United States primetime network television schedules
1999 in American television
2000 in American television